Terry and Me is a Canadian music variety television series which aired on CBC Television in 1956.

Premise
The jazz music series was hosted by singer Terry Dale and her announcer husband Alan Millar. Dale was supported by Dave Pepper's eight-member band.

Scheduling
Half-hour episodes were broadcast Saturdays 7:00 p.m. (Eastern) from 30 June to 29 September 1956.

References

External links
 

CBC Television original programming
1956 Canadian television series debuts
1956 Canadian television series endings
1950s Canadian music television series
Black-and-white Canadian television shows